Riverside Drive is a scenic north–south thoroughfare in the New York City borough of Manhattan. The road runs on the Upper West Side of Manhattan, generally paralleling the Hudson River and Riverside Park between 72nd Street and the vicinity of the George Washington Bridge at 181st Street. North of 96th Street, Riverside Drive is a wide divided boulevard. At several locations, a serpentine local street diverges from the main road, providing access to the residential buildings. Some of the city's most coveted addresses are located along its route.

History

Development
The  of land in the original park between 72nd to 125th Streets were originally inhabited by the Lenape people, but by the 18th century were used for farms by the descendants of European colonists. In 1846, the Hudson River Railroad (later the West Side Line and Hudson Line) was built along the waterfront, connecting New York City to Albany. In 1865, Central Park commissioner William R. Martin put forth the first proposal for a riverside park along the Hudson River. An act providing for such was presented to the Legislature by commissioner Andrew Haswell Green in 1866 and approved the same year. The first segment of Riverside Park was acquired through condemnation in 1872. The park also included the construction of Riverside Drive (then known as Riverside Avenue), a tree-lined drive curving around the valleys and rock outcroppings, overlooking the future park and the waterfront. The plans for Riverside Park and Avenue brought the attention of William M. Tweed, who bought several lots adjacent to the park in anticipation of its construction.

A selection process for the designers of Riverside Park followed, and in 1873 the commissioners selected Frederick Law Olmsted, a park commissioner who had also designed Central Park. Initially, Riverside Avenue had been planned to run in a straight line, which would have required a retaining wall and extensive fill. By then, the difficult topography of the area had come to the attention of the Manhattan park commissioners, and in 1873 Olmsted was given the authorization to redesign the grade of Riverside Avenue. To accommodate this, Olmsted devised a new plan that would create a main road extending from 72nd to 123rd Streets, with overpasses at 79th and 96th Streets, as well as "carriage roads" to serve the nearby neighborhood. The grade of the road was not to exceed 1:27. Riverside Avenue's main road would contain two roadways, one for each direction, separated by a median. A pedestrian path and a horse path would run alongside the avenue, and trees would provide shade along the route.

Over the following years, work proceeded on Riverside Avenue, with various ramps and stairs to the park as well as a bridle path between 104th and 120th Streets. In 1876 Olmsted was asked to create plans for the design of the avenue as a country drive, but ultimately it was paved. In late 1876, bids were accepted for the paving of Riverside Avenue. Olmsted was ousted as parks superintendent in December 1877. From 1875 to 1910, architects and horticulturalists such as Calvert Vaux and Samuel Parsons laid out the stretch of park/road between 72nd and 125th Streets according to the English gardening ideal, creating the appearance that the park was an extension of the Hudson River Valley. The avenue was opened in 1880 and was well-used by walkers, bikers, and drivers. The viaduct across 96th Street remained incomplete until 1902. In 1908, the avenue was renamed Riverside Drive.

Expansion of Riverside Park 

In the 1930s, New York Central Railroad's rail track north of 72nd Street was covered in a Robert Moses project called the West Side Improvement.  Moses' biographer Robert Caro described Moses surveying the area prior to his project, and seeing:

The Moses project, which was bigger than the Hoover Dam project, created the Henry Hudson Parkway, buried the West Side Line in the Freedom Tunnel, and greatly expanded Riverside Park. It was so skillfully done that many believe the park and road are set on a natural slope.

Riverside Park, part of the Manhattan Waterfront Greenway, is now a scenic waterfront public park on the narrow  strip of land between the Hudson River and Riverside Drive.

Riverside South

However, hampered by his weakened financial condition and opposed by six civic groups (Municipal Art Society, Natural Resources Defense Council, TNew Yorkers for Parks, Regional Plan Association, Riverside Park Fund, and Westpride), Trump agreed in 1990 to their plan, which was designed to mimic Riverside Park and Drive further north. Though scaled down, the project is still the second biggest private real estate venture under construction in New York City.

The new Riverside Park South, stretching between 72nd and 59th streets, is the central element of the development. Portions of the former rail yard, such as the New York Central Railroad 69th Street Transfer Bridge, are incorporated into the new park.

Route 
Starting at 72nd Street, Riverside Drive passes through the Manhattan neighborhoods of the Upper West Side, Morningside Heights, over Manhattanville in West Harlem by way of the Riverside Drive Viaduct and through Washington Heights. Below 72nd Street, Riverside Drive continues as Riverside Boulevard which stretches through Riverside South to 59th Street where it merges into the West Side Highway.

Only a few stretches of Riverside Drive were built along an older road; due to the hilly terrain, Riverside Drive crosses a natural cleft in the bedrock at 87th Street on an iron viaduct and passes over 96th Street, Tiemann Place and 135th Street, and 158th Street on further viaducts. At Tiemann Place and 135th Street, and at 158th Street, an old alignment is present, also named Riverside Drive, while the viaduct portion or main route is officially named and signed "Riverside Drive West". The viaduct between Tiemann Place and 135th Street is called the "Riverside Drive Viaduct", as it is the most notable of the Riverside Drive viaducts.

At its north end, Riverside Drive merges with the northbound lanes of the Henry Hudson Parkway; when the parkway was built, the Henry Hudson's northbound lanes used the roadway of Riverside Drive. In 2005, the retaining wall of Castle Village collapsed onto both Riverside Drive and the northbound lanes of the Henry Hudson Parkway. The wall was repaired and the roadway reopened in March 2008.

Riverside Drive terminated at Grant's Tomb in a cul-de-sac, prior to the construction of the Manhattan Valley viaduct, spanning 125th Street, completed in 1900. North of 158th Street the right of way which currently carries the name Riverside Drive was known as Boulevard Lafayette, which led to Plaza Lafayette in Hudson Heights. The section exiting the parkway at the Dyckman Street exit and ending at Broadway is still known as Riverside Drive.

The  New York City Bus route serves Riverside Drive from 72nd to 135th Streets. The  and  terminate at Riverside Drive and 158th Street.

Riverside Drive Viaduct

The elevated steel highway of the Riverside Drive Viaduct, built in 1901, runs between Tiemann Place and 135th Street above Twelfth Avenue. It is shouldered by masonry approaches, though the span proper was made of open hearth medium steel, comprising twenty-six spans, or bays. The south and north approaches are of rock-faced Mohawk Valley limestone with Maine granite trimmings, the face work being of coursed ashlar. The girders over Manhattan Street (now 125th Street) were the largest ever built at the time. The broad plaza effect of the south approach was designed to impart deliberate grandeur to the natural terminus of much of Riverside Drive's traffic as well as to give full advantage to the vista overlooking the Hudson River and New Jersey Palisades to the west.

F. Stuart Williamson was the chief engineer for the viaduct, which constituted a feat of engineering technology. Despite the viaduct's important utilitarian role as a highway, the structure was also a strong symbol of civic pride, inspired by America's late 19th-century City Beautiful movement. The viaduct's original roadway, wide pedestrian walks and overall design were sumptuously ornamented, creating a prime example of public works that married form and function. An issue of Scientific American magazine in 1900 remarked that the Riverside Drive Viaduct's completion afforded New Yorkers "a continuous drive of ten miles along the picturesque banks of the Hudson and Harlem Rivers."  The viaduct underwent a two-year-long reconstruction in 1961 and another in 1987.

Buildings and monuments

Residential buildings 

The eastern side of Riverside Drive was once a series of luxuriously finished rowhouses interspersed with free-standing nineteenth century mansions set in large lawns. Today, it is lined with apartment buildings such as the Normandy and the Master Apartments, as well as some remaining town houses from 72nd to 118th Streets.

The brick-faced Schwab House occupies the site of "Riverside", built for steel magnate Charles M. Schwab, formerly the grandest and most ambitious house ever built on Manhattan Island. Among the more eye-catching apartment houses are the curved facades of The Colosseum and The Paterno and the Cliff-Dwellers Apartments at 96th Street, with mountain lions and buffalo skulls on its friezes. The Henry Codman Potter house at 89th Street is one of the few remaining mansions on Riverside Drive; it houses Yeshiva Chofetz Chaim. The Master Apartments at 310 Riverside Drive, a landmarked 24-story Art Deco skyscraper, is near Columbia University and the 370 Riverside Drive building, which was erected in 1922–23 for approximately $800,000 by Simon Schwartz and Arthur Gross. International House is at 500 Riverside Drive, the next building north of Riverside Church, facing Grant's Tomb, with a back entrance on Claremont Avenue.

Other structures 
The Nicholas Roerich Museum is on 107th Street and Riverside Drive. The Interchurch Center and Riverside Church are located at 120th Street and Riverside Drive, while Sakura Park is located two blocks north. Other attractions on Riverside Drive include Riverbank State Park, Trinity Church Cemetery, Columbia-Presbyterian Medical Center, and Fort Washington Park.

Among the monuments along its route are the Eleanor Roosevelt Monument at 72nd Street, the Soldiers' and Sailors' Monument at 89th Street, Anna Hyatt Huntington's Joan of Arc at 93rd Street, a monument to John Merven Carrère by Thomas Hastings at 99th Street, Attilio Piccirilli's Fireman's Memorial at 100th Street, and Grant's Tomb.

Notable residents
 Marian Anderson (1897-1993), contralto and one of the most celebrated singers of the twentieth century; lived at 730 Riverside Drive.
 Hannah Arendt (1906-1975), political theorist, lived at 370 Riverside Drive from 1959 until her death in 1975.
 Saul Bellow (1915-2005), author, lived at 333 Riverside Drive in the 1950s
 Rafael Díez de la Cortina y Olaeta (1859-1939), linguist, resident of 431 Riverside Drive
 Ralph Ellison (1913-1994), writer, longtime resident of 730 Riverside Drive.
 Alfred T. Fellheimer (1875-1959), lead architect for Grand Central Terminal and Cincinnati Union Terminal; lived at 730 Riverside Drive.
 George Gershwin (1898-1937), composer and pianist; occupied a penthouse at 33 Riverside Drive.
 Ira Gershwin (1896-1983), lyricist; occupied a penthouse at 33 Riverside Drive, adjoining his brother's apartment.
 Katie Halper, American comedian, writer, journalist, filmmaker, podcaster, political commentator, and teacher.
 William Randolph Hearst (1863-1951), newspaper publisher; owned a five-story penthouse in the Clarendon at 137 Riverside Drive 
 Jacob K. Javits (1904-1986), United States Senator from New York from 1957 to 1981; lived at 730 Riverside Drive.
 Uwe Johnson, German author, lived with his family from 1966 until 1968 at 243 Riverside Drive, today The Cliff Dwelling apartments
 Paul Krugman bought an apartment on Riverside Drive with his Nobel Prize in economics money
 J. Robert Oppenheimer and his family lived at 155 Riverside Drive on 88th Street.
 Sergei Rachmaninoff owned a townhouse at 33 Riverside Drive, the predecessor to the present apartment block.
 Grantland Rice, American sportswriter
 Jim Rogers, investor and financial commentator  
 Damon Runyon, American newspaper man and author
 Babe Ruth, lived at 173 Riverside Drive, then moved to 110 Riverside Drive from 1942 until his death in 1948
 Serge Sabarsky, art dealer and art expert, lived at 110 Riverside Drive
 Thomas Sowell, American economist and social theorist, lived on the ground floor of a building on 152nd Street and Riverside Drive in the early 1950s.  s

In popular culture

Film
 Robert's apartment building in Enchanted (2007) is 440 Riverside Drive
 Kate's apartment building in Baby Mama (2008) is 210 Riverside Drive
 The living room of Oscar Madison's "large eight-room affair on Riverside Drive in the upper eighties" is the setting of the Neil Simon comedy, The Odd Couple (1965).
 In the movie Death Wish (1974), architect Paul Kersey (Charles Bronson) lives at 33 Riverside Drive.
 In the movie You've Got Mail (1998), Joe Fox lives at 152 Riverside Drive using the screen name NY152.
 The part of the drive over its eponymous viaduct has been seen in the movie The Amazing Spider-Man (2012).
 In the movie Vanilla Sky (2001), A deranged ex-girlfriend Julianna Gianni (played by Cameron Diaz) drives the lead character David Aames (Tom Cruise) off the road at 96th Street and Riverside Drive; The Cliff Dwelling at 243 Riverside Drive can be seen prominently in the background as the car breaks the bridge barrier, soars through the air and then off the bridge, severely injuring both characters and leaving Aames with a severe facial disfiguration.
 Scenes from Woody Allen's Manhattan (1979) were filmed at 265 Riverside Drive.
 Parts of the Walter Hill movie The Warriors (1979) were filmed at locations around Riverside Park.
 Gloria's apartment and key scenes from the John Cassavetes film, Gloria (1980) were filmed inside apartments at 800 Riverside Drive, The Grinnell. The iconic shootout was filmed alongside 790 Riverside Drive, The Riviera. 

Music
 Riverside Drive on the viaduct is also seen during the climax of Lady Gaga's music video for "Marry the Night" (2011).
 In the concert film Liza with a Z (1972), Liza Minnelli performs the number "Ring The Bells" about a woman who meets her dream man while traveling in Europe despite the fact that, initially unbeknownst to them, they'd been living next door to each other at 5 Riverside Drive.
 The hard rock band Tora Tora have a song called "Riverside Drive" on their debut album Surprise Attack (1992).

Literature
In P. G. Wodehouse's Piccadilly Jim, published in 1917, Riverside Drive is mentioned in the opening lines as a "breezy and expensive boulevard" with one of its "leading eyesores" being the home of Financier Peter Pett and his crime novelist wife Nesta Ford. 
 In the novel Illuminatus (1975), the character Joe Malik lives in a brownstone on Riverside Drive.
 In F. Scott Fitzgerald's first novel, This Side of Paradise, Amory visits Mrs. Lawrence on Riverside Drive and reflects that the open space feels more pleasant than the more crowded parts of the city.
 In the novels by Douglas Preston and Lincoln Child featuring Special Agent Pendergast, the main protagonist, Aloysius Pendergast, lives in his great-uncle's mansion at 891 Riverside Drive.
 In the novel Jahrestage (Anniversaries) by German author Uwe Johnson, the main character Gesine Cresspahl and her daughter Marie live at 243 Riverside Drive.

Television
 In the sitcom 30 Rock, Liz Lemon (Tina Fey) lives at 168 Riverside Drive.
 In the TV show Mad Men, copywriter Freddy Rumsen lives at 152 Riverside Drive.
 In the sitcom Will & Grace, Will lives at 155 Riverside Drive, as do Grace and Jack (Sean Hayes) at times throughout the series.
 In the USA Network series White Collar, Neal Caffrey (Matt Bomer) lives in the 4th floor studio of a mansion owned by elderly widow June (Diahann Carroll), located 351 Riverside Drive (the Schinasi Mansion).
 In the Amazon Studios series The Marvelous Mrs. Maisel, Midge (Rachel Brosnahan) and Joel (Michael Zegen) live in Apt 9C, located at 404 Riverside Drive (The Strathmore).

Theater
 Bob Randall's play 6 Rms Riv Vu (1972) tells the story of a married advertising copywriter and a discontented housewife who both end up looking at the same Riverside Drive apartment. The door is locked accidentally, trapping them inside, and a connection slowly develops as they begin to share the details of their respective lives.
 Between Riverside and Crazy is a 2014 play by Stephen Adley Guirgis.

Gallery

References
Notes

Bibliography
 Stern, Robert A. M.; Gilmartin, Gregory; Mellins, Thomas (2009) New York 1930. New York: Rizzoli.

External links
 Carter Horsley, "Riverside Drive," The City Review.
 

Hamilton Heights, Manhattan
Harlem
Inwood, Manhattan
Streets in Manhattan
Upper West Side
Washington Heights, Manhattan
Morningside Heights, Manhattan